Paper Shadows: A Chinatown Childhood is a non-fiction memoir written by the Canadian writer Wayson Choy, first published in October 1999 by Viking Press. In the book, the author chronicles his experience growing up as an immigrant in Vancouver's Chinatown in the 1940s and 1950s. Paper Shadows received shortlist honours for the 2000 Vancouver City Book Award and won the 2000 Edna Staebler Award for Creative Non-Fiction.

References

External links
Canadian Immigrant ORG, Immigrant Stories by Canadian Authors, Retrieved 21 November 2012

Canadian non-fiction books
1999 non-fiction books
Books by Wayson Choy
Canadian autobiographies